The Lotus approach may refer to:
The Lotus principle, a foundation of international law
IBM Lotus Approach database software